Florentine Angele Soki Fuani Eyenga is a Congolese politician.

From 1985 to 1987, Soki Fuani Eyenga was the Minister of Social and Women's Affairs for Zaire.

She was the minister of Health and Family in 1995.

References

20th-century Democratic Republic of the Congo women politicians
20th-century Democratic Republic of the Congo politicians
Living people
Year of birth missing (living people)
21st-century Democratic Republic of the Congo people